Bita Fayyazi (born 1962 in Tehran) is an Iranian artist and pioneer in the field of Iranian public art projects. She is known for her theatrical, large-scale work. Fayyazi currently lives, works and teaches at a private studio in Tehran.

Biography 
Fayyazi has 15 years work experience in the fields of ceramics and sculpture, with much of her work categorized as "dark ceramics" due to the subject matter.

She lived in England for a period of 7 years and returned to Iran in 1980.

She participated in the Iranian Pavilion at the 51st Venice Biennale in 2005 and has exhibited at, among others, Espace Louis Vuitton, Paris (2008 and 2010), the Museum of Modern Art in Freiburg (2007) and the Pergamon Museum, Berlin (2008). She has exhibited in two group exhibitions at Thaddaeus Ropac Gallery, Paris, notably in Be Crowned with Laurel in Oblivion (2010) with Ramin and Rokni Haerizadeh and the Stock Exchange of Visions project in 2007.

See also 
Modern and contemporary art in Iran
List of Iranian women artists

References

1962 births
Living people
20th-century Iranian women artists
21st-century Iranian women artists
Iranian sculptors
Iranian installation artists
Conceptual artists
Women conceptual artists
Iranian contemporary artists
People from Tehran
Iranian women sculptors
Iranian women ceramists